The hairy-footed flower bee (Anthophora plumipes)  is a species of bee belonging to the family Apidae.

Distribution
These bees are widespread in most of Europe and Asia from Britain to China and Japan, the Near East and in North Africa. In the 20th century, the species was introduced to the United States. The species was spotted for the first time in Ireland in April 2022.

Habitat
These bees commonly inhabit gardens, open woodland, and coastal sites.

Description
There are numerous color forms over the species' geographic range, which have resulted in this species being described under many different names. This species shows an evident sexual dimorphism. The body is always densely hairy. Males have most often bright reddish brown or gray hair, while females are usually all black or dark brown. Furthermore, the females show reddish orange scopal hairs on the hind tibia. The middle legs of males are very elongated. Males are also distinguished from females by having long hairs on its mid tarsi and the integument of the lower face yellow or cream coloured, rather than black. The long tufts of black hairs on the tarsi (hence the Latin word plumipes) are used as a visual signal during mating.

Biology
Anthophora plumipes is a univoltine species. These bees can be encountered from March to June, feeding and collecting pollen and nectar on early flowering plants, mainly on (Primulaceae species (Primula veris, Primula acaulis, etc.), Boraginaceae species (Pulmonaria officinalis, Borago officinalis, etc.), Lamiaceae species (Lamium purpureum) and Fumariaceae (Corydalis spp.).

These solitary bees do not build colonies. The females usually make nests in clay slopes and steep walls of mud, where they excavate cells, which they fill with pollen and nectar (as food for the larvae), laying a single egg on each pollen mass.

Gallery

Bibliography
 Michener C.D., The Bees of the World, Johns Hopkins University Press, 2000, .
Stone G.N, Female foraging responses to sexual harassment in the solitary bee Anthophora plumipes, in Anim. Behav. 1995; 50: 405–412.
Heiko Bellmann, Guide des abeilles, bourdons, guêpes et fourmis d'Europe, Delachaux et Niestlé, 1999, 336 p.

References

External links
 Wildbienen
 Les abeilles solitaires
 
 

Apinae
Hymenoptera of Africa
Hymenoptera of Asia
Hymenoptera of Europe
Insects described in 1772
Taxa named by Peter Simon Pallas